Szczyty (1936-1945: Maxwaldau) is a village in Gmina Baborów, Opole Voivodeship, Poland.

History 
In the German era, the village belonged to the historic Racibórz County, Upper Silesia.

People 
 Eduard von Liebert, died there
 Max Waldau, German Writer, died there, 1855

See also 
 Szczyty, Szczyty-Dzięciołowo, Szczyty-Nowodwory

Villages in Głubczyce County